Leena (Genelle Williams) is a fictional character on the U.S. television science fiction series, Warehouse 13 (2009–2014). She was the proprietor of Leena's Bed and Breakfast, where the Warehouse Agents live. Leena has the ability to read a person's aura and sense their life force.

Character history
Through the end of season 3, little has been revealed of Leena's personal history and her last name is unknown. It is implied, however, that she had a long-time relationship with Mrs. Frederic (C. C. H. Pounder).  When Marcus Diamond (Sasha Roiz) threatens Leena's life in the Season 3 finale "Stand", Mrs. Frederic arrives just in time to thwart Leena's murder.  When Leena says to Mrs. Frederic, "You never should have come", Mrs. Frederic replies, "I made you a promise a long time ago; I honor my commitments".

In the final episode, there is a flashback to Mrs. Frederic meeting Leena, apparently shortly after Leena starts working for Warehouse 13 in the packing department where she has a team of 14 people working under her. During the conversation, Leena gets a vision and says, "Someday I'm gonna die here... I can see it", to which Mrs. Frederic responds, "I promise you, Leena, I will do all that I can to prevent that." This appears to be the promise Mrs. Frederic made to Leena a long time ago.

It is also implied that Leena's working relationship with Artie Nielsen long predates the arrival of Agents Myka Bering and Pete Lattimer.  How long she has known Artie is not revealed; however, Leena states that she was not around fifteen years earlier, when Artie's partnership with James MacPherson (Roger Rees) dissolved.

Leena is employed at Warehouse 13 as a consultant, though her time is split between the warehouse and the B&B.  She has the ability to sense the energies of artifacts and is, therefore, the person who decides where to safely store them.  She also looks after artifacts that require regular maintenance to keep them from acting up.  Leena is privy to the secrets of the warehouse and knows things about Warehouse 13 that not even Artie knows.  Her access to and knowledge of warehouse files comes in handy when field agents come calling for help in tracking down or understanding artifacts.  Her bed and breakfast is possibly tied to the warehouse and its operations as well. Leena's Bed and Breakfast is actually a copy of the original stored in the warehouse, minus an artifact that turned it into a trap.

In the season 1 finale, "MacPherson", it appears that Leena is working with James MacPherson and covering her actions by posing as Claudia Donovan (Allison Scagliotti) with the aid of Harriet Tubman's thimble. However, in the Season 2 premiere, "Time Will Tell", it is revealed that MacPherson, using an artifact called the Pearl of Wisdom, is controlling her mind. When Mrs. Frederic realizes that Leena was being controlled by MacPherson, and she removes the Pearl of Wisdom from Leena's mind, some residual energy trapped in her brain causes her to suffer from headaches and vertigo. Leena contacts Mrs. Frederic about her symptoms, and Mrs. Frederic and the Regents use an artifact to travel through Leena's subconscious and remove the remaining energy.

In season 4, when Mrs. Frederic, Steve, and the other warehouse agents discover that the evil created by Magellan’s astrolabe resides in Artie as a dual personality, they warn Leena. As Leena witnesses Artie in the midst of a psychotic episode, Mrs. Frederic orders her to get out of the warehouse.  Rather than fleeing, Leena tries to help Artie, who ultimately kills her. Unlike agent Steve Jinks, whose death was undone using an artifact, Leena's death is irreversible.  Although the Regents clear Artie of responsibility in her death, since he was under the influence of an artifact, he feels guilty as it was by his hand that she died. To comfort Artie, the Regents give him the statement Leena recorded, stating she understood the risks posed by working for the Warehouse. This would imply that she was employed by the Warehouse, rather than a casual consultant.

Skills and abilities
Leena is able to read or sense auras and energy forces. She can sense whether something is living or not. She uses her aura-reading abilities on new artifact arrivals at the Warehouse. Likewise, she apparently does this so that the energies of the artifacts do not react badly with each other and cause unwanted static build-up that could harm Warehouse agents. For example, when handling the arrival of the Honjo Masamune samurai sword, she wandered the aisles, looking for an appropriate location to store it, finally stopping at an apparently random spot and stating, "This feels right." Leena's authority over artifact placement is further demonstrated when Artie, while contemplating where to store Edgar Allan Poe artifacts, states, "We'll stick them in, yeah, Madrid section, that is if Leena agrees."

Her aura-reading ability is also helpful in catching any potentially over-active objects that try to "escape" Warehouse confines, such as Harry Houdini's Wallet, which she sensed in the B&B and recovered from its hiding place under Myka's bed.

References

External links

 

Warehouse 13 characters
Television characters introduced in 2009
Fictional Secret Service personnel
Fictional African-American people